Songpu Subdistrict is a subdistrict of Songbei District, Harbin, Heilongjiang, China. It is located in the north of Harbin city, on the north bank of the Songhua River, 5 kilometers from the city center.

Etymology 
The meaning of Songpu is the wharf of Songhua River.

Geography 
Songpu is located on the north bank of the Songhua River. At the east and south the north is Limin of Hulan, while in the west is Qianjin and Binzhou Railway.

Transport 
The subdistrict has four train stations on the Binbei Railway: New Songpu Station, Miaotaizi Station, North Songpu Station, and Songbei Station.

Major motorways which run through Songpu Subdistrict include National Highway 202, the Harbin-Heihe Expressway, and the Harbin-Daqing Expressway.

History 
In 1850, it was named Majiachuankou (literally the wharf of Ma clan) when the wharf was owned by the Ma family. It became a small town, so on December 15, 1912, the governor of Heilongjiang Province ordered that the city council meet at Majiachuankou which belonged to Hulan County.

The next year, it changed its name to Songbei city council. In 1925, it changed its name to Songpu city council, and became part of Harbin special city in 1933. It became Songpu District in 1938.

In 1953, Songpu District had two townships, Songpu and Xinxing, and two subdistricts, Tangchang and Chuankou. In 1958, Songpu District was momentarily merged into Binjiang District, but Binjiang District was cancelled. Songpu township was then place in Daowai District. Songpu became a people's commune.

In 1979, Daowai restored all the subdistricts, and set more two subdistricts: Zhenjiang and Chuankou. In 1983, Songpu again became a township. In 1985, Songpu became a town, and Chuankou Subdistrict was merged into Songpu Town.

In 2004, Songpu belonged to Songbei District. In November, the Harbin government approved Songpu as a subdistrict.

In 2017,  became split off from Songpu. Chuankou took two residential communities, Chuankou and Guangxin Xincheng, and three villages, Taiyangsheng, Dongming, and Dengta from Songpu.

Administrative divisions 
Songpu Subdistrict administers 5 residential communities and 6 administrative villages. The subdistrict's residential communities are Tangchang, Changshengyuan, Bei'anqicheng, Beianxinghecheng, and Fulicheng. The subdistrict's administrative villages are Songpu, Songhuajiang, Dongfanghong, Hongxing, Xinhua and Liming.

Economy 
Numerous factories are located in Songpu Subdistrict, such as the Harbin Sugar Factory and Harbin Ship Factory.

References 

Harbin
Subdistricts of the People's Republic of China
Township-level divisions of Heilongjiang